This is a list of lighthouses in Bulgaria, which are all located on the Black Sea coast.

Lighthouses

See also
 Lists of lighthouses and lightvessels

References

External links

 

Bulgarian Black Sea Coast
Lighthouses
Lighthouses
Bulgaria